The Edinburgh Sevens is played annually as part of the IRB Sevens World Series for international rugby sevens (seven a side version of rugby union). The 2007 competition took place on 2 and 3 June, and was held at Murrayfield. It was the last leg of the 2006–07 IRB Sevens World Series.

New Zealand won the tournament after defeating Samoa, 34–5, in the final. Fiji were upset by Wales, 21–14, in their quarter-final. A Fijian victory would have guaranteed them the overall 2006–07 Series crown, however, as a result of their loss and New Zealand's tournament victory, New Zealand won the overall series.

Pool Stages

Pool A

|width=10| 
|Results
 Fiji 31–0 Kenya
 Australia 26–5 Portugal
 Fiji 31–5 Portugal
 Australia 12–17 Kenya
 Kenya 22–7 Portugal
 Fiji 29–7 Australia
|}

Pool B

|width=10| 
|Results
 Samoa 21–14 Wales
 France 0–19 Italy
 Samoa 36–0 Italy
 France 12–28 Wales
 Wales 43–0 Italy
 Samoa 26–12 France
|}

Pool C

|width=10| 
|Results
 South Africa 27–17 Canada
 Scotland 19–5 Russia
 South Africa 50–0 Russia
 Scotland 31–5 Canada
 Canada 12–19 Russia
 South Africa 17–24 Scotland
|}

Pool D

|width=10| 
|Results
 New Zealand 33–7 Argentina
 England 24–0 Georgia
 New Zealand 43–7 Georgia
 England 14–19 Argentina
 Argentina 31–5 Georgia
 New Zealand 38–0 England
|}

Finals
 1/4 Final Bowl  19–7 
 1/4 Final Bowl  29–7 
 1/4 Final Bowl  7–19 
 1/4 Final Bowl  12–19 
 1/4 Final Cup  14–21 
 1/4 Final Cup  19–12 
 1/4 Final Cup  10–22 
 1/4 Final Cup  14–12 
 SF Shield  33–17 
 SF Shield  19–17 
 SF Bowl  19–24 
 SF Bowl  12–19 
 SF Plate  19–14 
 SF Plate  17–19 
 SF Cup  0–28 
 SF Cup  14–24 
 Final Shield  21–12 
 Final Bowl  31–0 
 Final Plate  31–7 
 Final Cup  34–5

Final standings
The points awarded to each team after all 8 rounds of the 2006–07 season, as well as their overall points totals, are shown in the table below. 

{| class="wikitable sortable" style="text-align:center;"
|+ 2006–07 IRB Sevens – Series VIII
! style="border-bottom:1px solid transparent;"|
! 
! style="vertical-align:top;width:5.5em;border-bottom:1px solid transparent;padding:2px;font-size:85%;"|Dubai
! style="vertical-align:top;width:5.5em;border-bottom:1px solid transparent;padding:2px;font-size:85%;"|George
! style="vertical-align:top;width:5.5em;border-bottom:1px solid transparent;padding:2px;font-size:85%;"|Wellington
! style="vertical-align:top;width:5.5em;border-bottom:1px solid transparent;padding:2px;font-size:85%;"|San Diego
! style="vertical-align:top;width:5.5em;border-bottom:1px solid transparent;padding:2px;font-size:85%;"|Hong Kong
! style="vertical-align:top;width:5.5em;border-bottom:1px solid transparent;padding:2px;font-size:85%;"|Adelaide
! style="vertical-align:top;width:5.5em;border-bottom:1px solid transparent;padding:2px;font-size:85%;"|London
! style="vertical-align:top;width:5.5em;border-bottom:1px solid transparent;padding:2px;font-size:85%;"|Edinburgh
! style="border-bottom:1px solid transparent;"|Pointstotal
|- style="line-height:8px;" 
! style="border-top:1px solid transparent;"|  !! style="border-top:1px solid transparent;"|
! data-sort-type="number" style="border-top:1px solid transparent;"| !! data-sort-type="number" style="border-top:1px solid transparent;"| 
! data-sort-type="number" style="border-top:1px solid transparent;"| !! data-sort-type="number" style="border-top:1px solid transparent;"| 
! data-sort-type="number" style="border-top:1px solid transparent;"| !! data-sort-type="number" style="border-top:1px solid transparent;"| 
! data-sort-type="number" style="border-top:1px solid transparent;"| !! data-sort-type="number" style="border-top:1px solid transparent;"|
! data-sort-type="number" style="border-top:1px solid transparent;"|  
|-
|style="border-left:3px solid #7cf;"|1 ||align=left|
| 16 ||20 || 12 || 12 || 18 || 12 ||20 ||20 ||130
|-
|style="border-left:3px solid #7cf;"|2 ||align=left|
| 12 || 12 || 16 ||20 || 24 ||20 || 16 || 8 ||128
|-
|style="border-left:3px solid #7cf;"|3 ||align=left|
| 8 || 4 ||20 || 16 ||30 || 16 || 12 || 16 ||126
|-
|style="border-left:3px solid #7cf;"|4 ||align=left|
|20|| 16 || 12 || 8 || 18 || 6 || 8 || 4 ||92
|-
|style="border-left:3px solid #7cf;"|5 ||align=left|
| 12 || 12 || 8 || 4 || 8 || 4 || 2 || 2 ||52
|-
|6 ||align=left|
| 0 || 8 || – || – || 4 || 2 || 12 || 12 ||38
|-
|style="border-left:3px solid #7cf;"|7 ||align=left|
| 4 || 2 || 0 || 4 || 8 || 8 || 6 || 0 ||30
|-
|style="border-left:3px solid #7cf;"|8 ||align=left|
| 6 || 4 || 6 || 12 || 0 || 0 || 0 || 0 ||28
|-
|style="border-left:3px solid #7cf;"|9 ||align=left|
| 0 || 0 || 0 || 6 || 8 || 4 || 4 || 4 ||26
|-
|style="border-left:3px solid #7cf;"|10 ||align=left|
| 2 || 0 || 2 || 0 || 3 || 0 || 4 || 12 ||23
|-
|style="border-left:3px solid #7cf;"|11 ||align=left|
| 0 || 0 || 4 || 0 || 0 || 12 || 0 || 6 ||22
|-
|12 ||align=left|
| – || – || 0 || 2 || 8 || 0 || – || – ||10
|-
|style="border-left:3px solid #7cf;"|13 ||align=left|
| 4 || 0 || 4 || 0 || 0 || 0 || 0 || 0 ||8
|-
|14 ||align=left|
| 0 || 6 || – || – || 0 || – || – || – ||6
|-
|style="border-left:3px solid #7cf;"|15*||align=left|
| 0 || 0 || 0 || 0 || 2 || 0 || 0 || 0 ||2
|-
|15*||align=left|
| – || – || 0 || 0 || 2 || – || – || – ||2
|-
|17 ||align=left|
| – || – || – || – || 1 || – || 0 || 0 ||1|-
|rowspan=14 
|align=left|
| – || – || – || – || 0 || – || 0 || 0 ||0
|-
|align=left|
| 0 || 0 || – || – || – || – || – || – ||0
|-
|align=left|
| – || – || 0 || – || 0 || – || – || – ||0
|-
|align=left|
| – || – || – || – || 0 || 0 || – || – ||0
|-
|align=left|
| – || – || – || – || 0 || 0 || – || – ||0
|-
|align=left|
| – || – || – || – || – || – || 0 || 0 ||0
|-
|align=left|
| 0 || – || – || – || – || – || – || – ||0
|-
|align=left|
| – || 0 || – || – || – || – || – || – ||0
|-
|align=left|
| – || – || 0 || – || – || – || – || – ||0
|-
|align=left| 
| – || – || – || 0 || – || – || – || – ||0
|-
|align=left|
| – || – || – || 0 || – || – || – || – ||0
|-
|align=left|
| – || – || – || – || 0 || – || – || – ||0
|-
|align=left|
| – || – || – || – || 0 || – || – || – ||0
|-
|align=left|
| – || – || – || – || 0 || – || – || – ||0
|}

Sources: rugby7.com (archived), irb.com (archived), world.rugby (archived)

Notes:
 Light blue line on the left indicates a core team eligible to participate in all events of the series.

 Points for the event winners are indicated in bold. A zero (0) is recorded in the event column where a team played in a tournament but did not gain any points. A dash (–) is recorded in the event column if a team did not compete at a tournament.
 Teams that share a position in the standings (on the same total series points) are marked with an asterisk (*) beside their position. Any teams that did not score any points in the overall series are marked with N/A in the position column. They are sorted by most number of events played, earliest date of events played, then alphabetically by team name.

External links
 
 

Edinburgh Sevens
Edinburgh
Edinburgh Sevens
Scotland Sevens